Katelyn Gosling (born May 8, 1993) is a Canadian women's ice hockey player. Having earned Canadian Interuniversity Sport All-Canadian honours while competing for the Western Mustangs women's ice hockey program, Gosling was claimed by the Calgary Inferno in the 2016 CWHL Draft. She would also compete with Canada's national team at the Winter Universiade, serving as Canada's captain at the 2017 tournament.

Playing career
During her teens, Katelyn played in the PWHL for the London Devilettes.

Western Mustangs
In the aftermath of the 2012-13 season, Gosling was named to the CIS First Team All-Canadians. Among the other players named as First Team All-Canadians were Melodie Daoust and Hayley Wickenheiser.

Katelyn was a co-captain of the Mustangs program that captured the gold medal at the 2015 CIS women's ice hockey national championships. Her sister, Cassidy Gossling was also a member of the championship team. In her final season with the Western Mustangs, Gosling was named a First Team All-Canadian.

International play
Katelyn was a member of the Team Canada squad that captured a silver medal at the 2015 Winter Universiade Games in Spain. She would serve as Team Canada's captain for the 2017 Winter Universiade in Kazakhstan, as Canada obtained another silver medal.
 
In May 2015, Katelyn was invited to Team Canada's Development Team Conditioning camp.

Competing with Canada's Under-22 national team at the 2016 Nations Cup, Gosling would score her first international goal. Said goal took place in a 4-2 win against Russia, which also stood as the game-winning tally. The win allowed Canada to advance to the gold medal game.

Gosling would compete for the Canadian Under-22 national team that competed at the 2017 Nations Cup. Gosling and her Canadian teammates would emerge with a silver medal at the Nations Cup, losing to Finland by a 1-0 tally.

Gosling was named to the Canadian roster that played at the 2018 4 Nations Cup.

CWHL
Selected by the Calgary Inferno in the second round of the 2016 CWHL Draft, Gosling made her debut with the club on October 9, 2016, a contest against the Brampton Thunder. Gosling would also earn her first CWHL point in the contest, gaining an assist on a goal scored by Jillian Saulnier.

Gosling's first CWHL goal took place in only her second career game. An October 29 tilt with the Boston Blades saw her score in the third period against goaltender Lauren Dahm. Earning the assist on her goal was Rhianna Kurio.

Named as one of the participants in the 3rd CWHL All-Star Game, Gosling would suit up for Team Blue in a 9-5 loss. Gosling would appear with the Inferno in the 2019 Clarkson Cup finals, capturing her first championship in the CWHL.

Early life 
Raised in London, Ontario, Katelyn immerged as a promising hockey player at just 6 years old. In high school she was the captain of the prestigious Mother Teresa Secondary School hockey team. One of the top teams in the nation.

Career Stats

CIS

CWHL

Awards and honours
2012, OUA All Rookie Team 
2013, CIS First Team All-Canadian 
2013, OUA First Team All Star 
2014, OUA First Team All Star 
2014, Western Women's Hockey Team MVP 
2015, CIS Nationals Tournament All-Star Team 
2015, CIS Second Team All-Canadian 
2015, OUA First Team All Star 
2016, CIS First-Team All-Canadian
Participant, 3rd CWHL All-Star Game

References

1993 births
Living people
Calgary Inferno players
Canadian women's ice hockey defencemen
Clarkson Cup champions
Ice hockey people from Ontario
Sportspeople from London, Ontario
Universiade medalists in ice hockey
Universiade silver medalists for Canada
Competitors at the 2015 Winter Universiade
Competitors at the 2017 Winter Universiade
Professional Women's Hockey Players Association players